Keith Nobbs (born April 9, 1979) is an American stage, television, and film actor perhaps best known for his portrayal of Joey "Ice Cream" in the TV series The Black Donnellys.

Life and career
A graduate of Fiorello H. LaGuardia High School of Music & Art and Performing Arts, Nobbs began working in professional theater in the 1998 production of Stupid Kids, directed by Michael Mayer. His Broadway debut was in the Roundabout Theatre Company production of The Lion In Winter starring Laurence Fishburne and Stockard Channing, also directed by Mayer. Other notable New York stage appearances include Hope Is the Thing With Feathers (Drama Dept.), Fuddy Meers (Manhattan Theatre Club), Free to Be... You and Me (The Drama Dept.), Dublin Carol (Atlantic Theater Company), The Hasty Heart (Keen Company), and the world premiere of David Mamet's Romance  (Atlantic Theater Company) . For his performance in Four (Manhattan Theatre Club) Nobbs was nominated for the 2002 Drama Desk Award for Outstanding Featured Actor in a Play, and won the 2002 Lucille Lortel Award for Outstanding Featured Actor. His most recent stage appearance was in the Century Center for the Performing Arts production of Dog Sees God: Confessions of a Teenage Blockhead. Nobbs is a member of The Drama Department and the Vineyard Theatre Community of Artists.  He  appears with Dan Lauria and Judith Light in the Broadway production: Lombardi.

Nobbs's television appearances include New York Undercover, The Sopranos, Law & Order, and Law & Order: Criminal Intent. His film credits include Double Whammy, Phone Booth, 25th Hour, and It Runs in the Family, as well as the independent films I Will Avenge You, Iago! and Premium. His latest film efforts include In Search Of, and HBO's The Pacific.

Filmography

Television
 Public Morals (2015) as Pat Duffy
 Person of Interest (Episode "Mission Creep" [2011] as Straub)
 In Plain Sight (2010) as Charlie Connor
 The Pacific (2010) as Bud "Runner" Conley
 Fringe (Episode: "Unleashed" [2009] as Carl Bussler)
 Numb3rs (Episode: "Disturbed" [2009] as Ralph)
 The Black Donnellys (2007) as Joey Ice Cream
 Law & Order: Criminal Intent (Episode "The Good" [2006] as Kevin Colemar)
 Law & Order (Episode "Embedded" [2003] as Sgt. George Meacham)
 Law & Order (Episode "Missing" [2002] as Evan Tario)
 Law & Order (Episode: "All My Children" [2001] as Adam)
 The Sopranos (Episode "College" [1999] as Bowdoin Student)
 New York Undercover (Episode "Sign O' The Times" [1998] as Billy)

Cinema
 Muhammad Ali's Greatest Fight (2013) as Douglas's Clerk
 Weakness (2011) as Pete
 The Briefcase (2011) as Dan
 In Search Of (2008) as Andy
 Premium (2006) as Derick
 I Will Avenge You, Iago! (2005) as The Viewer
 It Runs in the Family (2003) as Stein
 25th Hour (2002) as Luke
 Phone Booth (2002) as Adam
 Double Whammy (2001) as Duke

Theater
 The Legend of Georgia McBride  (2015) Off-Broadway, MCC Theater - Rexy/Jason
 Bronx Bombers (2014) Broadway, Circle in the Square Theatre - Billy Martin
 Lombardi (2010) Broadway, Circle in the Square Theatre - Michael McCormick
 Three Sisters (2008) Williamstown Theater Festival - Baron Tuzenbach
 Dog Sees God: Confessions of a Teenage Blockhead (2005) Century Center for the Performing Arts - Van
 Romance (2005) Atlantic Theater Company - Bernard
 The Triple Happiness (2004) Second Stage Theatre - Mike
 Dublin Carol (2003) Atlantic Theater Company - Mark
 Free to Be... You and Me (2002) Drama Dept., Greenwich House Theatre - Actor
 Four (2002) Manhattan Theatre Club - June
 Fuddy Meers (1999) Manhattan Theatre Club - Kenny
 Hope is the Thing with Feathers  (1998) Drama Dept., Greenwich House Theatre - Actor
 The Lion in Winter (1999) Broadway debut, Criterion Center Stage Right-Roundabout Theatre Company - John
 Stupid Kids (1998) Century Center for Performing Arts, WPA Theatre - John "Neechee" Crawford

Awards and nominations
 2002: Lucille Lortel Award for Four
 2002: Drama Desk Award Nomination for Four

References

External links
 
 
 

1979 births
American male film actors
American male television actors
Living people
Male actors from Texas
Place of birth missing (living people)
Fiorello H. LaGuardia High School alumni
American male stage actors
20th-century American male actors
21st-century American male actors